The Madagascar national basketball team is the national basketball team representing Madagascar. It is administrated by the Fédération Malagasy de Basket-Ball (Madagascar Basketball Federation).

Its biggest success has been the 9th place at the FIBA Africa Championship 1972 where Madagascar surprisingly finished ahead of team Côte d'Ivoire and team Nigeria.

Madagascar was chosen as host of the FIBA Africa Championship 2011. The country received the bid from Côte d'Ivoire where the event could not take place because of instabilities after the civil war. Madagascar's automatic qualification is only the 3rd time in its history. Its last appearance at Africa's most prestigious basketball event was in 2003.

Competitive record

Summer Olympics
yet to qualify

World championships
yet to qualify

FIBA Africa Championship

African Games

1965-1978 : Did not qualify
1987 : ? (Qualified)
1991-2015 : Did not qualify

Current roster
Roster for the AfroBasket 2021 qualification matches played on 19, 20 and 21 February 2021 against Tunisia, Central African Republic and DR Congo.

Depth chart

Past rosters
Roster for the 2011 FIBA Africa Championship. (last publicized squad)

At the AfroBasket 2011 in Antananarivo, Charles Ramsdell hit most field goals for Madagascar, whereas Romule Razafimahasahy hit most three pointers, and Yerison Rabekoto hit most free throws.

Head coach position
  Angel Manzano: 2011
  Juan Collazo: 2020-present

See also
Madagascar women's national basketball team
Madagascar national under-19 basketball team
Madagascar national under-17 basketball team
Madagascar women's national under-17 basketball team
Madagascar national 3x3 team

References

External links
Official website 
FIBA profile
Archived records of Madagascar team participations
Fédération Malagasy de Basket Ball  - Facebook Presentation
Madagascar Men National Team 2011 Presentation at Afrobasket.com

1963 establishments in Madagascar
Basketball in Madagascar
Madagascar national basketball teams